The Gillig Transit Coach School Bus is a series of buses that were produced by the American bus manufacturer Gillig from 1940 to 1982. Alongside its namesake usage as a yellow school bus, the Transit Coach also served as the basis of motorcoaches and other commercial-use vehicles. Marketed primarily to operators on or near the West Coast of the United States (California, Washington State, or Oregon), the Transit Coach competed nearly exclusively against the similar Crown Supercoach through much of its production.           

The Transit Coach was the first school bus produced with a mid-engine layout and would be among the first to use a diesel-fueled engine. The model line also offered the highest-capacity school bus ever produced, offering up to 97-passenger seating (current design standards restrict maximum capacity to 90).         

After 1982, Gillig discontinued the Transit Coach after 42 years of production, concentrating its resources on the Gillig Phantom transit bus. For 1986, the company reentered school bus production, developing a school bus variant of the Phantom that was offered from 1986 through 1993; the high-floor Phantom was manufactured through 2008.         

The Transit Coach was manufactured by Gillig in its now-former facility in Hayward, California; while no longer a manufacturer of school buses, Gillig currently exists as the second-largest American manufacturer of transit buses.

Background
Founded in 1890, Gillig Brothers initially existed as a manufacturer of custom-built automobile bodies. In the 1920s, the company produced the "Gillig top", a lift-off hardtop for open cars that provided retractable side curtains. As closed cars became more widely available, the company focused on body production, producing its first school bus body in 1932. In 1937, Gillig Brothers moved from San Francisco to Hayward, California.

During the late 1930s, school bus manufacturers were beginning to develop transit-style school buses. In comparison to a cowled-chassis bus mounted on a truck frame, a transit-style bus allowed for greater seating capacity within the same body length; manufacturers also experimented with engine configurations.

Design history

1940–1957
In 1940, after several years of experimenting, Gillig introduced the production Transit Coach. Using a Fabco chassis powered by a Hall-Scott gasoline engine, the Transit Coach adopted a mid-engine configuration, placing the engine on its side.

During World War II,  Gillig entered war production, building hundreds of "Victory Trailer" trailer buses, serving as large-scale transportation on US military bases.   

Following the war, the company returned to production of buses, with the Transit Coach resuming production. In 1948, a rear-engine configuration (in line with many other competitors) was introduced for the first time. Alongside the Transit Coach, Gillig sold the Gillig Coach conventional bus, sharing elements of its body design with its transit-style counterpart.  

Through the early 1950s, the mid-engine Transit Coach overtook the rear-engine configuration in demand. In 1950, Gillig introduced the Model 590, fitted with a 590 cubic-inch Hall-Scott engine, the largest-displacement gasoline engine ever fitted in a school bus. The early 1950s Transit Coach was offered in multiple seating capacities, up to 79 passengers.        

Through most of the 1950s, the Transit Coach design had only minor changes, distinguished from later examples by a smaller windshield, lower roofline, different Gillig badging, and dual (instead of quad) headlamps.

1957–1977
In 1957, Kenworth ended its presence in the bus segment, resulting in Gillig obtaining the product rights to the Pacific bus product lines. With the acquisition of the tooling from Kenworth, the roofline of the Transit Coach was introduced with redesigned front and rear roof caps. While Gillig would not adopt the four-pane windshield of the Pacific T-Series, the Transit Coach saw its windshield expanded in size (from 2,340 to 2,580 square inches); until its 1982 discontinuation, the model line offered the largest windshield on a school bus.  

Along with restructuring school bus production on the West Coast to essentially a Gillig Transit Coach–Crown Supercoach duopoly, the acquisition of Pacific led to design changes for the Transit Coach that were retained for the rest of its production.    

In 1959, Gillig introduced the first diesel-powered Transit Coach, offering two models. Similar to the Crown Supercoach, the mid-engine Model 743 was powered by a 743 cubic-inch Cummins NHH220 underfloor inline-6; the Model C-180 was the first diesel-powered school bus with a rear-mounted engine (Cummins C-180). To increase intake ventilation for the diesel engine, Gillig added a roof-mounted air intake (first used on the Pacific, in slightly different form). As another addition, the Model 534 was a rear-engine bus powered by a Ford Super Duty gasoline V8 (replacing the Hall-Scott and International Harvester engines). The rear-engine diesel Transit Coach would prove successful, as manufacturers of rear-engine transits from the eastern United States did not widely offer diesel engines until the 1970s; Crown did not offer a diesel rear-engine Supercoach (in school bus form) until the late 1980s.

During the 1960s, in response to the Baby Boom generation reaching school age, school buses grew in size to accommodate the growth of student populations. From 1948, the highest-capacity Transit Coach offered seating for 79 student passengers. In 1967, several changes were made to the Transit Coach. The Model 743DT-16 was introduced, expanding from 13 to 16 rows of seating by extending the body to 41 feet long, requiring tandem rear axles.  Offering a seating capacity of 97 student passengers, the DT-16 was the largest school bus ever mass-produced. In line with similar Crown Supercoaches, the DT-16 was configured with tandem rear axles; unlike motorcoaches, both rear axles were driven. In another change, the interior height was raised 7 inches, from 72 inches to 79 inches. A rear-engine version of the DT-16 was offered, the 636DT-16, powered by the Caterpillar 1160 V8 (later the 3208).  

In the early 1970s, Gillig introduced several new engines and retired others. In 1971, the first Detroit Diesel engine was offered, the Model 318D (powered by a 6V53 V6). In 1974, the Model 743 became the Model 855, as the Cummins NHH engine was enlarged to 855 cubic inches; in contrast to its 220 hp predecessor, turbocharged versions were introduced (available up to 335 hp). In 1974, the final gasoline-powered Transit Coach was produced.  In 1976 and 1976, the Transit Coach introduced the Model 555 and Model 426, powered by the Cummins VTF555 V8 and Detroit Diesel 6N71 inline-6, respectively.  

In 1974, the interior of the Transit Coach underwent a revision, with a molded-fiberglass dashboard replacing the previous all-metal design. To improve driver ergonomics, key switches were relocated from under the steering wheel onto a single control panel left of the driver; many full-size school buses use this layout to this day. In states outside of California, amber warning lights began to be phased in as a requirement alongside the red warning lights (seen since the 1940s); in 1975, the Transit Coach was offered with amber warning lights for the first time (to meet Washington State specifications).

1977–1982
In April 1977, federal safety standards went into effect in the United States, intended to improve the crashworthiness and structural integrity of school buses. In compliance, manufacturers had to produce stronger bodies to better survive crashes and rollovers, seats had to adopt compartmentalization as a passive restraint system. While largely unchanged from the outside, from 1977 onward, the Transit Coach adopted high-back padded seats; the largest model offered now seated 90 passengers instead of 97 (as the padded seats took up more interior space).     

During 1979 production, Gillig made the first visible exterior revisions to the Transit Coach since the company purchased the Pacific product line in 1957. In a major change, the windows were changed from a drop-sash configuration to a larger split-sash design (used on all school buses except the Crown Supercoach), the guard rails on the side of the bus were revised for the first time, as the guard rail below the windows matches the two on the lower body, replacing the previous set of four (used since the 1940s).

Discontinuation
For the school bus industry as a whole, the early 1980s was a period of struggle. At the same time Gillig had facelifted the Transit Coach, two East Coast manufacturers (Superior and Ward) had closed their doors; several others were also struggling financially. Alongside the recession economy, student population growth had largely plateaued, as the entire Baby Boom generation was past the age of secondary education. Gillig Corporation, as a fairly niche manufacturer, saw its school bus sales drop off significantly; in 1980, the company ended production of the Gillig Coach conventional entirely.   

In the late 1970s, Gillig launched efforts to diversify its product line; after a joint venture with Neoplan, the company developed its own mass-transit bus, leading to the Gillig Phantom in 1980. In 1982, the company chose to concentrate on mass-transit production, ending production of the Transit Coach after a 42-year production run. In 1986, a successor to the Transit Coach was introduced as Gillig launched a school bus variant of the Phantom; the Phantom school bus was withdrawn in 1993.

Production
Through the production of the Transit Coach, Gillig used the following numbering system to designate school bus models.

Body configuration
C-Type C (conventional)

D-Type D (Transit Coach)

T-Tandem rear axle

"#"-Number of rows of seats (maximum 16 before 4/1/1977, 15 after 4/1/1977)

Example: 426DT15= A Transit Coach with 15 rows of seats, tandem rear axles, and a 6N71 Detroit Diesel engine.

Depending on engine type, Transit Coaches were sold in 28' (only with gasoline engines), 30', 35', 37', and 40' body lengths. The two longest body lengths only were sold with a diesel engine (the 37' could not be ordered as a 318D, a C-Series, or a VTF555-D).

Powertrain

See also

 Crown Supercoach – similar California-manufactured school bus
 Kenworth – manufacturer of Kenworth-Pacific buses (sold product rights and tooling to Gillig)
 Blue Bird All American
 Thomas Saf-T-Liner

References
 Gillig Corporation, gillig.com, retrieved on 2008-01-22
 Gillig Transit Coach/Pacific SchoolCoach Online Museum, gilligcoaches.net, retrieved on 2008-01-22
 Leo Gillig Automobile Works – Gillig Brothers, coachbuilt.com, retrieved on 2006-12-25
 A Brief History of Hall-Scott, northern.edu, retrieved on 2006-12-26

Notes

External links
 Gillig Corporation
 busexplorer.com Gillig Page

School buses
Vehicles introduced in 1940
Motor vehicles manufactured in the United States
Gillig